Nagayatippa is a village in Krishna district of the Indian state of Andhra Pradesh. It is located in Mopidevi mandal of Machilipatnam revenue division.

See also 
Villages in Mopidevi mandal

References 

Villages in Krishna district